Rye Patch State Recreation Area is a  state park unit of Nevada, United States, adjoining Rye Patch Reservoir, an  impoundment on the Humboldt River, and the smaller Pitt-Taylor Reservoirs.

History
The park is located in a part of Nevada that in prehistoric times was under Lake Lahontan. Archaeological evidence from Lovelock Cave and elsewhere shows that humans would camp along the Humboldt about 8,000 years ago.

In the mid-19th century, particularly during the California Gold Rush, travelers along the Humboldt would graze their cattle on the wild ryegrass in the area near present-day Rye Patch Reservoir, which was known as Lassen Meadows. At Lassen Meadows the Applegate-Lassen Cut-Off of the California Trail, which provided a quicker route to Goose Lake in northeast California and the California gold fields, left the main route of that trail and headed toward the Black Rock Desert.

The Rye Patch Dam was constructed between 1933 and 1936 by the Public Works Administration as a New Deal relief project during the Great Depression. In 1971 the reservoir was made a Nevada State Recreation Area.

Activities and amenities
Among the facilities the park offers are a campground, picnic areas, and a launch for boating. Visitors can fish for crappie, wipers, white bass, channel catfish, black bass, and walleye.

References

External links

Rye Patch State Recreation Area Nevada State Parks
Rye Patch State Recreation Area Map Nevada State Parks

State parks of Nevada
Protected areas of Pershing County, Nevada
Protected areas established in 1971
1971 establishments in Nevada
New Deal in Nevada